Living Color is a 1992 thriller film by Neal Taylor about a cat and mouse game between Molly (Kim Denman) and killer Christian (Michael Julian Knowles). It was shot in Brisbane between 5–21 January 1992 and was not released theatrically.

References

External links

Australian thriller films
1992 films
1990s thriller films
1990s English-language films
1990s Australian films